Legislative elections were held in El Salvador on 23 March 1958. The result was a victory for the Revolutionary Party of Democratic Unification, which won all 54 seats unopposed after opposition candidates withdrew from the elections.

Results

References

Bibliography
Political Handbook of the world, 1958. New York, 1959. 
Eguizábal, Cristina. 1984. "El Salvador: elecciones sin democracia." Polemica (Costa Rica) 14/15:16-33 (marzo-junio 1984).
Institute for the Comparative Study of Political Systems. 1967. El Salvador election factbook, March 5, 1967. Washington: Institute for the Comparative Study of Political Systems.
Ruddle, Kenneth. 1972. Latin American political statistics. supplement to the statistical abstract of Latin America. Los Angeles: Latin American Center, UCLA.

El Salvador
Legislative elections in El Salvador
1958 in El Salvador
One-party elections
Election and referendum articles with incomplete results